Herreid is a surname. Notable people with the surname include:

Charles N. Herreid (1857–1928), American politician
Walter Herreid (1896–1941), American football player and coach